Nina Baden-Semper (born 1945) is a Trinidad and Tobago-born British actress best known for her role as Barbie Reynolds in the 1970s sitcom Love Thy Neighbour, produced by Thames Television.

Career

Born in Trinidad and Tobago, Baden-Semper was a dancer when she first came to Britain before going on to act.

In an acting career that spans more than 40 years, Baden-Semper has appeared in numerous radio, television, film and theatre productions and has toured worldwide in many plays. She has played varied stage roles in dramatic works that range from The Bacchae by Euripides, Le Bourgeois Gentilhomme by Molière and The Blacks by Jean Genet to modern thrillers such as Wait Until Dark and Stepping Out, as well as comedy roles. She has been a television presenter for children’s programmes and also Morning Worship for the BBC, and has made numerous guest appearances on quizzes, talks and panel shows both nationally and internationally. Baden-Semper made two single releases and an album and was recently a rapper on a So Solid Crew video. She has appeared mainly in character parts on television, including in the ill-fated revival of Crossroads in 2002. In 2006, she guest-starred in the Doctor Who audio adventure Memory Lane. In the BBC Two black magazine showcase The A-Force, she appeared in the series entitled Brothers and Sisters as Elder Gittens' widow. Baden-Semper is also the cousin of American jazz, funk and soul music producer and artists George Semper.

In 2005, Baden-Semper appeared as Mary Seacole at a bicentenary exhibition at the Florence Nightingale Museum.

Awards and honours

Baden-Semper has been the recipient of Joint Television Award and also Outstanding Female Personality, and was the subject of the ITV programme This Is Your Life on 12 March 1975. She was also given the Scarlet Ibis Award by the Trinidad & Tobago High Commission in London for meritorious service.

Filmography
Film
Carry On Up the Jungle (1970) – Girl Nosha (uncredited)
Kongi's Harvest (1970) – Segi
The Love Ban (1973) – Skyline Waitress
Love Thy Neighbour (1973) – Barbie Reynolds
Rage (1999) – Godwin's mother

Television
Six Shades of Black  (1965) – Fatima
Redcap (1966) – Nurse
Public Eye (1966) – Barmaid / Pearl
The Corridor People (1966) – Pearl
Intrigue  (1966) – Nurse
Rainbow City (1967) – Nurse
The Wednesday Play (1968) – Ward nurse
Mystery and Imagination (1968) – Vampire
Counterstrike (1969) – Mrs. Sengupta
Armchair Theatre (1970) – Annie Steffans
Callan (1970) – Anna
Confession (1970) – Waitress
Take Three Girls (1970) – Claire
The Persuaders! (1970) – Air Hostess
Dear Mother...Love Albert (1970) – Ursula
Thick as Thieves (1971)
Love Thy Neighbour (1972–1976) – Barbie Reynolds
Whodunnit? (1975) – Panellist
Machinegunner (1976) – Felicity Rae Ingram
George and Mildred (1979) – Sister
The Bill (1988) – Mrs. Leigh
Children's Ward (1989) – Jan Stevens
Little Napoleons (1994) – Earnestina
Crossroads (2002) – Rhona Martin
Bernard's Watch (2004) – Bami (Last appearance)

References

External links
 
Nina Baden-Semper at Aveleyman – Actor, Film and TV Vidcaps.

1945 births
Living people
Black British actresses
Black British women comedians
British television actresses
British film actresses
British people of Trinidad and Tobago descent
20th-century British actresses
21st-century British actresses
Trinidad and Tobago television actresses
Trinidad and Tobago film actresses
Trinidad and Tobago emigrants to the United Kingdom
Trinidad and Tobago stage actresses